Mount Higgins is a 5,176-foot-elevation mountain summit located at the western edge of the North Cascades Range, in Skagit County, Washington. Mount Higgins has two subsidiary summits,  Skadulgwas Peak, the fin-shaped middle peak, and also  Mount Higgins Lookout Site, the western sub-summit. The mountain is set on land administered by the Mount Baker–Snoqualmie National Forest. Mount Higgins is situated along the north side of State Route 530, mid-way between the communities of Darrington and Oso, near the site of the 2014 Oso mudslide. The nearest higher neighbor is Round Mountain,  to the north-northeast. This mountain is named for Oso homesteader Walter Higgins. The first ascent was made in 1888 by John Higgins, Frank Lawrence, and Al Baker. Precipitation runoff from Mount Higgins drains into tributaries of the Stillaguamish River.

Climate

Mount Higgins is located in the marine west coast climate zone of western North America. Most weather fronts originate in the Pacific Ocean, and travel northeast toward the Cascade Mountains. As fronts approach the North Cascades, they are forced upward by the peaks of the Cascade Range, causing them to drop their moisture in the form of rain or snowfall onto the Cascades (Orographic lift). As a result, the west side of the North Cascades experiences high precipitation, especially during the winter months in the form of snowfall. During winter months, weather is usually cloudy, but, due to high pressure systems over the Pacific Ocean that intensify during summer months, there is often little or no cloud cover during the summer.

Geology 
The North Cascades features some of the most rugged topography in the Cascade Range with craggy peaks, ridges, and deep glacial valleys. Geological events occurring many years ago created the diverse topography and drastic elevation changes over the Cascade Range leading to the various climate differences. These climate differences lead to vegetation variety defining the ecoregions in this area.

The history of the formation of the Cascade Mountains dates back millions of years ago to the late Eocene Epoch. With the North American Plate overriding the Pacific Plate, episodes of volcanic igneous activity persisted.  In addition, small fragments of the oceanic and continental lithosphere called terranes created the North Cascades about 50 million years ago.

During the Pleistocene period dating back over two million years ago, glaciation advancing and retreating repeatedly scoured the landscape leaving deposits of rock debris. The “U”-shaped cross section of the river valleys are a result of recent glaciation. Uplift and faulting in combination with glaciation have been the dominant processes which have created the tall peaks and deep valleys of the North Cascades area.

See also
 2014 Oso mudslide

References

External links
 Weather forecast: Mount Higgins

Mountains of Washington (state)
Mountains of Skagit County, Washington
Cascade Range
North American 1000 m summits
Mount Baker-Snoqualmie National Forest